Wilcox Academy is an independent school in Camden, Alabama. It is accredited by the Alabama Independent School Association and the Southern Association of Colleges and Schools. The school has been described as a segregation academy.

History
Wilcox Academy was founded in 1970 as a segregation academy. The school's enrollment boomed in the 1970s as white parents withdrew their children from public schools. As of the early 2000s, some white parents were beginning to send their children to public schools because they were dissatisfied with Wilcox Academy's ability to provide quality academic programs with shrinking enrollment. The Wilcox Academy chairman declined comment on academic performance comparisons with public schools, stating that he "see[s] no advantage for us revealing any information for public consumption."

Demographics
As of 1990, no black students had ever attended the school.  In 2015–16, no black students attend.

Of 278 non-prekindergarten students enrolled in the 2011–2012 school year, 276 were white. The 2012 demographic profile of Wilcox County, showed the population as 27.4% white and 71.8% black.

Deer and Turkey Hunts
Wilcox Academy has a six hundred plus member organization which holds two benefit hunts each year. The Turkey Hunt, normally held the end of March or early April, began in 1971 and was followed by the Gun Deer Hunt in 1985, which is held in early January.

Notable alumni
 Mike Stewart, novelist.

References

External links
 Wildcats Sports History
 Deer and Turkey Hunts

Educational institutions established in 1970
Segregation academies in Alabama
Private high schools in Alabama
Schools in Wilcox County, Alabama